Rodrigo Oliveira Lindoso (born 6 June 1989) is a Brazilian professional footballer who last played as a midfielder for Brasileirão Série B club Ceará.

Club career

Madureira and loans
Born in São Luís, Maranhão, Lindoso was a Madureira youth graduate. He made his first team debut on 5 July 2009, starting in a 0–0 Série D home draw against Tupi.

Lindoso became a regular starter for the side in the following campaigns, scoring a hat-trick in a 4–3 home win against Botafogo-SP on 14 August 2010. Impressing during the 2011 Campeonato Carioca, he joined Série A side Fluminense on 16 May 2011, on loan for one year.

Lindoso made his top tier debut on 7 September 2011, starting in a 2–1 away win against Cruzeiro. The following February, after being rarely used, he moved to Criciúma also in a temporary deal.

After again receiving limited chances, Lindoso returned to Madureira for the 2013 Campeonato Carioca, where he stood out as one of the team's best performers.

Marítimo
On 25 June 2013, Lindoso signed a four-year contract with Portuguese Primeira Liga side C.S. Marítimo. He made his debut abroad on 1 September, coming on as a half-time substitute for João Luiz in a 1–1 home draw against S.C. Olhanense.

Lindoso struggled to appear for the side, being also sidelined due to an injury.

Madureira return
In February 2014, Lindoso returned to Madureira after rescinding his contract with Marítimo. He immediately became a first-choice for the club, scoring five goals in the 2015 Campeonato Carioca.

Botafogo
On 21 July 2015, Lindoso was loaned to Botafogo in the Série B, until the end of the year. On 1 December, after achieving top tier promotion as champions, he signed a permanent two-year contract with the club.

Lindoso scored his first goal in the first division on 21 May 2017, netting his team's second in a 2–0 home win against Ponte Preta. On 14 July, he extended his contract until 2019.

Internacional
On 8 January 2019, Lindoso agreed to a two-year deal with Internacional, with Alex Santana moving in the opposite direction.

Career statistics

Honours
Botafogo
Campeonato Brasileiro Série B: 2015
Campeonato Carioca: 2018

Individual 
Campeonato Carioca Team of the year: 2018

References

External links

1989 births
Living people
People from São Luís, Maranhão
Brazilian footballers
Association football midfielders
Campeonato Brasileiro Série A players
Campeonato Brasileiro Série B players
Campeonato Brasileiro Série C players
Campeonato Brasileiro Série D players
Madureira Esporte Clube players
Fluminense FC players
Criciúma Esporte Clube players
Botafogo de Futebol e Regatas players
Sport Club Internacional players
Ceará Sporting Club players
Primeira Liga players
C.S. Marítimo players
Brazilian expatriate footballers
Brazilian expatriate sportspeople in Portugal
Expatriate footballers in Portugal
Sportspeople from Maranhão